is a top-down perspective rally racing video game developed by ADK and released by SNK Corporation for the Neo Geo system. It was released by SNK on December 20, 1991 and would be followed by an spiritual successor in 1996, Over Top.

Gameplay

Players begin by choosing a vehicle based on handling, acceleration, and overall speed. The game is played from an overview perspective with the camera focused on the players car at all times. The races take place from the 1992 World Rally Championship and the 1992 Paris–Cape Town Dakar Rally with a variety of terrain.

Reception 

In Japan, Game Machine listed Thrash Rally on their December 15, 1991 issue as being the sixteenth most-successful popular arcade game at the time. On release, Next Generation reviewed the Neo-Geo version of the game, rating it one star out of five, and stated that "for mindless fun, Rally Chase comes in at about average". Famicom Tsūshin scored the Neo Geo version a 22 out of 40. Setsu of French magazine HardCore Gamers drew comparison with Micro Machines.

Notes

References

External links 
 Thrash Rally at GameFAQs
 Thrash Rally at Giant Bomb
 Thrash Rally at Killer List of Videogames
 Thrash Rally at MobyGames

1991 video games
ACA Neo Geo games
ADK (company) games
Arcade video games
Dakar Rally
Multiplayer and single-player video games
Neo Geo games
Neo Geo CD games
Nintendo Switch games
Off-road racing video games
PlayStation Network games
PlayStation 4 games
Racing video games
Video games developed in Japan
Video games scored by Hideki Yamamoto
Video games scored by Hiroaki Shimizu

Xbox One games
Hamster Corporation games